"Bow Down to Washington" is the official fight song of the University of Washington. It was written by  Lester J. Wilson in 1915 while partaking in a competition requesting a new song for the university. The competition was sponsored by the campus newspaper, The Daily, and had a grand prize of US$25 (the equivalent of $655 in 2021).

"Bow Down to Washington" was first used as a fight song at the Washington-California football game on November 6, 1915, in a 72–0 away victory. The lyrics were first published one week later in the home program for the November 13, 1915 contest, again versus California.

The song is typically played and sung at all University of Washington sporting events at which the University of Washington Husky Marching Band is present, including all football, basketball, and volleyball games.

References

Pac-12 Conference fight songs
American college songs
University of Washington
1915 songs